Agustín García Calvo (October 15, 1926 – November 1, 2012) was a Spanish philologist, philosopher, poet and playwright.

Biography 
García Calvo was born and died in Zamora.  He read Classical Philology at Salamanca University, being one of the first students of Spanish philologist Antonio Tovar. He concluded his doctoral dissertation on Ancient prosody and metrics in Madrid at the age of 22. In 1951 he worked as a grammar-school teacher. In 1953 he was appointed to a university chair of Classical Languages in Seville, and he occupied a second chair at Madrid's Universidad Complutense (then called "Central University of Madrid") from 1964 to 1965. In 1965 the Franco administration expelled him from his Madrid chair, along with Enrique Tierno Galván, José Luis López Aranguren and Santiago Montero Díaz, because they had given support to student protests against the fascist government. José María Valverde and Antonio Tovar resigned from their university chairs as a sign of protest against this reprisal. García Calvo spent many years of his subsequent exile in Paris, being appointed professor at Lille University and at the Collège de France. He also worked as a translator for the exiled Spanish publishing house Ruedo Ibérico. In the French capital he organized a regular circle of political discussion in one of the cafés of the Latin Quarter. In 1976, following the death of General Franco, he recovered his chair in Madrid, where he remained teaching ancient philology until his retirement in 1992. He was emeritus professor at the Universidad Complutense until 1997 and remained active as a lecturer, writer and columnist until his death in 2012.

Political thought 

In his written works and public statements, García Calvo attempted to give voice to an anonymous popular sentiment that rejects the intrigues of Power. An essential part of this struggle consists in denouncing Reality - an idea that appears to be a true reflection of "what there is", while in fact it is an abstract construction in which things are reduced by force to the status of mere ideas. In this process of reduction all unpredictable and undefined aspects that may be found in things are destroyed, thus facilitating their subjection to all kinds of plots, schemes and intrigues. People - just another case of a "thing" - are in this way organized into individuals, subject to a double and contradictory requirement, which is that each of them has to be the one he is, and yet all of them have to constitute a mass of many. Fortunately this kind of social organization always leads to flaws and imperfections, and it is just these unpredictable impulses, inaccessible to planning and calculation, to which García Calvo refers when he speaks of "the people".

The ever-increasing sophistication of Power arrives at its pinnacle in democratic societies that are composed of masses of individuals. Given that the "scheme of progress" consists in imposing this democratic system in all parts of the world, popular struggle has to be directed against democracy itself, being this the kind of political régime that administers death to the people in the most advanced societies. The simultaneous survival of comparatively old-fashioned systems of domination (for example, communist dictatorships and some forms of religious rule in Arab countries) is only meant to legitimate democracy through a rhetoric of "unfavourable comparison" and must therefore be considered a "cheat".

An essential ingredient of the maintenance of Power and Reality is God, a personage who has assumed many different names (such as the name of Man) in the past, but in his most advanced and sophisticated form presents himself under the name of Money - a ubiquitous idea to which everything can be reduced, since everything has a cost or value. The religion in which this new God is worshipped is Science - a religion whose most important mission is to keep the idea of Reality up-to-date and to convince individuals that everything is under control.

In democracy, State and Capital are only two manifestations of the same underlying phenomenon. Popular struggle must be directed against both, without ever claiming a "right" to anything (as this would imply an acknowledgement of the legitimacy of Power) or proposing alternative forms of government (as this would only contribute to the further advance of Power). This popular struggle is not an individual struggle (since the individual, created after the image of the State, is essentially a reactionary entity and must be conceived as the people's most important adversary), but rather the people's struggle - a struggle that originates in what remains in us of the people, beneath all our individual features and in open contradiction with these.

Speech or language plays an important role in oppressing the people, but also in their rebellion. Those words that have signification in each of the world's languages constitute a Reality that happens to be different in each tribe. Insofar as language helps create the illusion that we know everything there is and that we know how to call it and how to manipulate it, language is a weapon directed against the people. On the other hand we continuously see conjectures or glimpses arise in the common use of language that point to the opposite conclusion (that we do not know what there is and that Reality does not reach so far as to include everything that occurs), and in this sense language, something that anyone can use although no-one can possess it, also constitutes the people's self-expression par excellence.

Specific examples of what this struggle against Reality may look like can be found (1) in García Calvo's attacks on the car (the individual vehicle) and his activism in defence of the train, (2) in the struggle against the idea that "we all together form public finance" and (3) in the decision to use the same style in writing as in oral communication, as opposed to the pedantic use of language that we know from academic scholars, civil servants and newspaper journalists.

Spanish bibliography 
 Librosdeagustingarciacalvo.blogspot.com

Grammar and language theory
 (Madrid : Sociedad de Estudios Clásicos, 1954)
 (Madrid: Siglo XXI, 1973)
 (Barcelona: La Gaya Ciencia, 1975)
 (Zamora: Lucina, 1979; 2 ªed correg. 1991).
 (Zamora: Lucina, 1983).
 (Zamora: Lucina, 1999).
 (Premio Nacional de Ensayo 1990)  (Zamora: Lucina, 1989; 2ª ed. 1990; 3ª  ed. 1990; 4ª ed. 1993)
 (Zamora: Lucina, 2002).

Logic
De los números (Barcelona: La Gaya Ciencia, 1976)

Editions and translations of classics
Aristófanes,  (Zamora: Lucina, 1981;  2ª ed. 1998).
Don Sem Tob,  (Madrid: Alianza Editorial, 1974).
Herakleitos,  (Zamora: Lucina, 1985).
Homero,  (Zamora: Lucina, 1995).
Xenophon,  (Madrid: Alianza Editorial; 1967, Salvat editores, 1971).
 (Zamora: Lucina, 1981: 3.ª ed. con el Parmenides renovado 2001).
Lucrecio, . Edición crítica y versión rítmica de A. García Calvo (Zamora: Lucina, 1997).
Plautus,  (Madrid: Cuadernos para el Diálogo, 1971).
Platón,  (Barcelona: Salvat Editores, 1972).
 (Zamora: Lucina, 1992).
Socrates (en , t. II, fasc.30), (Barcelona: Salvat Editores, 1972).
Sophocles, . Versión rítmica de A. García Calvo (Zamora: Lucina, 1982; 2ª ed. 1988; 3ªed. 1993).
Virgilio (Madrid: Ediciones Júcar, 1976).

Other translations
Shakespeare, William, Sonetos de amor ( texto crítico, traducción en verso, introducción y notas) (Barcelona: Anagrama, 1974)
Shakespeare, William, Sueño de noche de verano (1980: 2.ª ed. 1988: 3.ªed- 1993)
Shakespeare, William, Macbeth (1980) Versiones rítmicas de A. García Calvo. ed Lucina
Marquis de Sade Instruir deleitando o Escuela de amor (La philosophie dans le boudoir). Traducción y prólogo de A. Garcia Calvo- (Zamora: Lucina, 1980: 2.ªed. 1988)
Georges Brassens. 19 Canciones. Con versión para cantar de A. Garcia Calvo (1983) ed. Lucina
Belli, Giuseppe-Gioachino, 47 sonetos romanescos con las versiones de Agustín García Calvo (Zamora: Lucina, 2006)
Valéry, Paul, Le Cimetière Marin / El Cementerio Marino con la versión rítmica de Agustín García Calvo (Zamora: Lucina, 2006)

Essays, politics
Contra el Tiempo (Zamora: Lucina, 1993; 2ª edición 2001)
De Dios (Zamora: Lucina, 1996)
Actualidades (Zamora: Lucina, 1980)
Análisis de la Sociedad del Bienestar (Zamora: Lucina, 1993: 2ª ed. 1995)
Cartas de negocios de José Requejo (Zamora: Lucina, 1981)
Contra la Pareja (Zamora: Lucina, 1994: 2ª ed. 1995)
Noticias de abajo (Zamora: Lucina, 1991 -   2.ª ed. 1991  - 3ª ed.1995)
Locura. 17 casos (Zamora: Lucina).
De la felicidad (Zamora: Lucina, 1986; 2.ª ed. 1989; 3ª ed- 1991, 4ª ed. 2000)
De los modos de integración del pronunciamiento estudiantil (Zamora: Lucina, 1987)
El amor y los 2 sexos. Del tiempo de amor y olvido  (Zamora: Lucina, 1984: 2.ª ed. 1991)
Familia: la idea y los sentimientos (Zamora: Lucina, 1983; 2ª ed. 1992)
Historia contra tradición. Tradición contra Historia (Zamora: Lucina, 1983; 2ª ed. 1998)
Contra el hombre (con dos epílogos de Isabel Escudero) (Madrid: Fundación de Estudios Libertarios, Anselmo Lorenzo, 1996)
Manifiesto contra el despilfarro(Madrid: Banda de Moebius, 1977)
¿Qué es el Estado? (Barcelona: La Gaya Ciencia,1977)
Apotegmas apropósito del marxismo (París: Ruedo Ibérico, 1970)
Contra la Paz. Contra la Democracia (Barcelona: Editorial Virus, 1993)
¿Qué es lo que pasa? (Zamora: Lucina, 2006)

Poetry
Al burro muerto ... (1998), ed. Lucina.
Bebela (1987;  2ª ed 2001), ed. Lucina.
Canciones y soliloquios (1982; 2.ª ed. 1993), ed. Lucina.
Del tren (83 notas o canciones) (1981), ed. Lucina.
Libro de conjuros (1979;  2ªed 1981;  3ª ed 1991;  4ª ed. 2000), ed. Lucina.
Más canciones y soliloquios (1988), ed. Lucina.
Ramo de romances y baladas (1991), ed. Lucina.
Relato de amor (1980; 2.ª ed. 1982; 3ªed. 1989; 4ª ed.1993), ed. Lucina.
Sermón de ser y no ser (1980;  2ª ed.1984;  3ª ed. 1988; 4ªed. 1995), ed. Lucina.
Valorio 42 veces (1986), ed. Lucina.
Uno o dos en 23 sitios y más, ed. Lucina.
4 canciones de amor perdido y el cínife (2006), Ediciones del 4 de Agosto.

Theatre
Baraja del Rey Don Pedro (Premio Nacional de Literatura Dramática 1999) ( 1998;  2ªed. 1999) ed. Lucina
Ismena. Tragicomedia musical (1980)ed. Lucina
Rey de una hora (1984) ed. Lucina
Tres farsas trágicas y una danza titánica. "Traspaso», «Dos amores», "Velatorio» y "Rotura», cuatro obras de teatro de una media hora de duración.  (1980) ed. Lucina
Los carboneros (Acharneis). Aristófanes

Other
 Himno de la Comunidad de Madrid (1983 BOCM)
Eso y ella. 6 cuentos y una charla  (1987; 2ª ed 1993) ed. Lucina
¿Qué coños? 5 cuentos y una charla.  (1990; 2ª ed 1991; 3ª ed. 1991: 4ª ed. 1995) ed. Lucina

Articles
Scientific articles on philology and linguistics published in journals Emérita, Estudios Clásicos, Revista Española de Lingüística, Saber Leer, etc. Articles on politics in the journal Archipiélago, and newspapers El País, Diario 16, La Razón, etc.

Agustin's translated work 
What is it that's happening? Translated by Eduardo Guzmán Zapater.
Analysis of Welfare Society 
Interview with Agustín García Calvo: "The future is a vacuum that doesn't let us live".

Awards
In 2006 he was awarded the Premio Nacional a la Obra de un Traductor.

References

External links 
 Editorial Lucina
 Baúl de Trompetillas
 Blog de Lucina
 Agustín García Calvo's Books

1926 births
2012 deaths
People from Zamora, Spain
Spanish philologists
Spanish translators
20th-century Spanish writers
21st-century Spanish writers
20th-century Spanish philosophers
21st-century Spanish philosophers
Linguists from Spain
Spanish Latinists
English–Spanish translators
French–Spanish translators
Greek–Spanish translators
Latin–Spanish translators
Complutense University of Madrid alumni
Complutense University of Madrid
University of Salamanca alumni
Exiles of the Spanish Civil War in France
20th-century translators
Translators of William Shakespeare